Bogotá is the Americas city with the most extensive and comprehensive network of bike paths with a total of 564 kilometers at year 2022. Bogotá’s bike paths network or Ciclorrutas de Bogotá in Spanish, designed and built and is also one of the most extensive in the world.

The design of the network was made taking into consideration the morphology and topography of the city. This is, from north to south the city has a flat topography and from east to west the city has varying degrees of inclination.

A mesh concept was applied for the theoretical plan of the network because it presented greater versatility and adaptation given that the road network was designed as a grid plan with streets going from south to north and from east to west.

The network was also integrated with the TransMilenio bus system which has bicycle parking facilities.

Network hierarchy 

A network hierarchy was determined following the criteria above.

 Main Network: connects the main centres of the city in a direct and expeditious manner, for instance connecting the main work and education centers with the most populated residential areas, and receiving the flow from secondary networks.

 Secondary Network: leads riders to the main network, it connects housing centers and attraction centres and parks with the main network.

 Complementary Network: links and provides continuity to the network. It consists of additional bike paths that are required to complete the mesh system and to distribute bicycle traffic on specific areas. It includes a recreational network, local networks and a system of long green areas.

Bike paths' impact on city life
Since the construction of the bike paths, bicycle use has quintupled in the city. There were 635,431 trips made daily in Bogotá by bicycle in 2015, corresponding to a modal share of 4.28%. A large portion of this use is in southern, poorer areas.

The bike paths are an ongoing project. Many segments are still not connected to the main network. In some parts, they are placed on the sidewalk in a way that puts pedestrians and cyclists in competition.

Routes

Year 2016

Year 2022 
Bogotá currently has 564 kilometers of bike paths and various projects under construction and design to expand this network, such as "CicloAlameda Medio Milenio", "Corredor Verde de la 7ma" and "Transmilenio Avenida 68".

See also 

 Segregated cycle facilities
 Ciclovía 
 World Carfree Network

References

Cycleways in Colombia
Transport in Bogotá